Costabissara is a town and comune in the province of Vicenza, Veneto, northern Italy. It is west of the SP46 provincial road. It is said that Vladimir Putin's ancestry comes from this town, although it is not proven.

References

External links
(Google Maps)

Cities and towns in Veneto